This is main scientific society in Japan interested in the study of the Autonomic Nervous System. It is affiliated with the Japanese Association of Medical Sciences. Its official journal is The Autonomic Nervous System (Jiritsu shinkei; ISSN 0288-9250) founded in 1964.

External links 
 Japanese Association of Medical Sciences
 International Society for Autonomic Neuroscience

References 

Neuroscience organizations